Demmings is a surname. Notable people with the surname include:

Doug Demmings (1951–2002), American boxer

See also
Demings
Demmin (surname)
Demming